Southern Province is a defunct province of Afghanistan. The former province's capital was Gardez.  
  
In March 1924 it was governed by Amr al-Din. A dispute between him and a local magistrate led to the Khost rebellion, which saw the entire province rise up against King Amanullah. The rebellion lasted until January 1925, and 14,000 people perished as a result of it.

In 1944–1947, the province was the scene of revolts by various tribes.  

As of 1946, it had a population of 882,170.

It was dissolved in 1964 to create the province of Paktia.  

Paktia Province
Former provinces of Afghanistan

References